Elisabeth Tigerstedt-Tähtelä is a Finnish diplomat. She is a Master in lawyer and has been Finnish Ambassador to several countries

Tigerstedt-Tähtelä has been Finnish Ambassador to Vietnam from 1988 to 1989, and in Cairo, Egypt from 1990 to 1992 and in  Zagreb, Croatia from  1997 to 1998

Tigerstedt-Tähtelä retired from post of Ambassador to Croatia in autumn 1998 and has subsequently worked for the  Committee on the Rights of the Child (during the four-year term  from 1999 to 2003.

References 

Ambassadors of Finland to Vietnam
Ambassadors of Finland to Egypt
Ambassadors of Finland to Croatia
20th-century Finnish lawyers
Finnish women lawyers
Finnish women ambassadors
Year of birth missing (living people)
Living people